Zygoballus melloleitaoi is a species of jumping spider which occurs in Argentina. It is known only from a single female specimen collected in Puerto Victoria, Misiones.

Taxonomy
The species was originally described in 1945 by Brazilian arachnologist Cândido Firmino de Mello-Leitão as Gastromicans sexpunctata. In 1980, the Argentinian arachnologist María Elena Galiano transferred the species to the genus Zygoballus. Because the name Zygoballus sexpunctatus was already in use, Galiano gave the species a new name, Zygoballus melloleitaoi, in honor of Mello-Leitão. Jerzy Prószyński's Global Species Database of Salticidae lists the species as "dubious". However, it is listed as a recognized species by Platnick's World Spider Catalog (Version 10.5).

Description
The only known specimen is a female 4 mm in length.

The type specimen is housed at the La Plata Museum in Argentina (Zenzes collection, No. 16.785).

References

External links
Zygoballus melloleitaoi at Worldwide database of jumping spiders
Zygoballus melloleitaoi at Global Species Database of Salticidae (Araneae)

Salticidae
Spiders described in 1980
Spiders of Argentina